This is a list of central processing units based on the ARM family of instruction sets designed by ARM Ltd. and third parties, sorted by version of the ARM instruction set, release and name. In 2005, ARM provided a summary of the numerous vendors who implement ARM cores in their design. Keil also provides a somewhat newer summary of vendors of ARM based processors. ARM further provides a chart displaying an overview of the ARM processor lineup with performance and functionality versus capabilities for the more recent ARM core families.

Processors

Designed by ARM

Designed by third parties
These cores implement the ARM instruction set, and were developed independently by companies with an architectural license from ARM.

Timeline 
The following table lists each core by the year it was announced.

See also

 Comparison of ARMv7-A processors
 Comparison of ARMv8-A processors
 List of products using ARM processors

References

Further reading

 
Lists of microprocessors